1128 Astrid, provisional designation , is a carbonaceous Astridian asteroid from the central region  of the asteroid belt. It is the parent body of the Astrid family and measures approximately 40 kilometers in diameter.

The asteroid was discovered by Belgian astronomer Eugène Delporte at the Royal Observatory of Belgium in Uccle on 10 March 1929, and later named for Astrid of Sweden, Queen consort of the Belgians.

Orbit and classification 

Astrid is the parent body of the Astrid family, a smaller asteroid family of nearly 500 carbonaceous members. It is located in the outermost central main-belt, near a prominent Kirkwood gap, that marks the 5:2 orbital resonance with Jupiter, and divides the asteroid belt into a central and outer part.

Astrid orbits the Sun at a distance of 2.7–2.9 AU once every 4 years and 8 months (1,700 days). Its orbit has an eccentricity of 0.05 and an inclination of 1° with respect to the ecliptic.

Physical characteristics 

In the SMASS classification, Astrid is a carbonaceous C-type asteroid, which corresponds to the overall spectral type of the Astrid family.

Rotation period 

In September 2005, a rotational lightcurve of Astrid was obtained from photometric observations by French amateur astronomer René Roy. Lightcurve analysis gave a rotation period of 10.228 hours with a brightness variation of 0.29 magnitude. In October 2010, additional lightcurves were obtained at the Palomar Transient Factory in California, as well as by astronomers Eric Barbotin and Raoul Behrend, which gave a concurring period of 10.2 and 10.229 hours with an amplitude of 0.10 and 0.13 magnitude, respectively.

Diameter and albedo 

According to the surveys carried out by the Infrared Astronomical Satellite IRAS, the Japanese Akari satellite and the NEOWISE mission of NASA's Wide-field Infrared Survey Explorer, Astrid measures between 33.28 and 52.48 kilometers in diameter  and its surface has an albedo between 0.031 and 0.077.

The Collaborative Asteroid Lightcurve Link derives an albedo of 0.0644 and a diameter of 34.60 kilometers based on an absolute magnitude of 10.9.

Naming 

This minor planet was named in memory of Astrid of Sweden (1905–1935), Queen consort of the Belgians, who died at the age of 29 in a car accident while on vacation in Switzerland. The official naming citation was mentioned in The Names of the Minor Planets by Paul Herget in 1955.

References

External links 
 Asteroid Lightcurve Database (LCDB), query form (info )
 Dictionary of Minor Planet Names, Google books
 Asteroids and comets rotation curves, CdR – Observatoire de Genève, Raoul Behrend
 Discovery Circumstances: Numbered Minor Planets (1)-(5000) – Minor Planet Center
 (1128) Astrid at AstDyS-2, Asteroids Dynamic Site
 
 

001128
Discoveries by Eugène Joseph Delporte
Named minor planets
001128
19290310